The 1969 Investiture Honours were appointments made by Queen Elizabeth II of the United Kingdom to various orders and honours released on 7 July 1969, on the occasion of the investiture of her eldest son, Charles (now Charles III), as Prince of Wales. The awards were of a special character compared to most honours lists, in that the awardees were selected due to their links with Wales, or involvement with the investiture ceremony itself.

Knights Bachelor 
 David Joseph Davies, Chairman, Wales Tourist Board.
 Geraint Llewellyn Evans . For services to Music.
 Robert Charles Evans , Principal, University College of North Wales, Bangor. For services to Mountaineering.
 The Reverend Albert Evans-Jones  (Cynan). For services to Welsh Literature.
 Archibald James Lush. For social services to Wales.

Royal Victorian Order

Knight Grand Cross (GCVO) 
 Rt Hon. Antony Charles Robert, Earl of Snowdon

Knight Commander (KCVO) 
 Goronwy Hopkin Daniel  
 Lieutenant-Colonel William Jones Williams

Commander (CVO) 
 Squadron Leader David John Checketts 
 Major Francis Jones 
 Robert Hefin Jones

Member (MVO) 

Fourth Class
 John Philip Brooke Brooke-Little
 Lieutenant-Colonel Rodney Onslow Dennys 
 Lieutenant-Colonel Sidney Goodchild

Fifth Class
 22714520 Warrant Officer Class I, Gordon Ivor Amphlett, The Royal Regiment of Wales (24th/41st Foot).
 Michael Corfield
 Henry Gray

Order of the British Empire

Dame Commander (DBE) 
Civil Division
 Lady Olwen Elizabeth Carey Evans. For public services in Wales.

Commander (CBE) 
Military Division
Royal Navy
 Captain Robert Gwilym Lewis-Jones 
Civil Division
 Ivor Egwad Jones . For services to Rugby Football.
 John Eryl Owen-Jones, Clerk of the Caernarvonshire County Council.

Officer (OBE) 
Civil Division
 Thomas Gwynne Davies, Borough Engineer and Surveyor, Royal Borough of Caernarvon.
 Arwel Hughes, Head of Music, Welsh Region, British Broadcasting Corporation.
 Tegid Lloyd Roberts, County Surveyor, Caernarvonshire County Council.
 John Oswald Smith, Town Clerk, Royal Borough of Caernarvon.
 Carl Toms, Stage and Interior Designer.
 John Spark Wilson, Commander, Metropolitan Police.

Member (MBE) 
Civil Division
 John Langran Pound, Principal Design Officer, Ministry of Public Building and Works.

British Empire Medal 
Military Division
Army
 Lance-Corporal John Swaine, Corps of Royal Engineers.

Civil Division
 David Morris Jones, Head Custodian, Caernarvon Castle.

References 

British honours system
1969 in the United Kingdom
1969 awards